The Man in the Family is an American sitcom television series that aired on ABC from June 19 until July 31, 1991.

Premise
The black sheep of the family takes over the family-owned grocery store in Brooklyn following his father's death.

Cast
Ray Sharkey as Sal Bovasso
Annie De Salvo as Annie Bovasso
Julie Bovasso as Angie Bovasso
Don Stark as Cha Cha
Leah Remini as Tina Bovasso
Louis Guess as Uncle Bennie
Billy L. Sullivan as Robbie

Episodes

References

External links
 

1991 American television series debuts
1991 American television series endings
1990s American sitcoms
English-language television shows
American Broadcasting Company original programming
Television series by Sony Pictures Television
Television shows set in New York City